The 2012 Indiana gubernatorial election took place on November 6, 2012. Incumbent governor Mitch Daniels was term-limited and unable to seek a third term. The Republican candidate, Congressman Mike Pence; the Democratic candidate, former Speaker of the Indiana House of Representatives John R. Gregg; and the Libertarian candidate, youth mentor, small business owner and reality TV personality, Rupert Boneham, were all unopposed in their respective primaries or conventions and contested the general election. This is the first open Indiana gubernatorial election since 1996 and the first gubernatorial election since 1972 without the governor or lieutenant governor as a nominee.

When the polls closed, the election was very close, and continued to stay close throughout the night. Gregg performed well in Marion County (Indianapolis) and Lake County (Gary), which were Democratic strongholds. Pence performed well in the Indianapolis suburbs and the Fort Wayne area. At 12:34 am EST, the Associated Press called the race for Pence. At 1:06 am, Gregg called Pence to concede, realizing there weren't enough votes left to overtake him. Pence ultimately won the election and took office on January 13, 2013. This was the closest race for governor since 1960.

Primaries

Democratic
 John R. Gregg, former Speaker of the Indiana House of Representatives

Results

Libertarian
 Rupert Boneham, four-time contestant on Survivor and founder of Rupert's Kids. Boneham was nominated by delegates at his party's state convention.

General election

Candidates
 Mike Pence (Republican), U.S. Representative
Running mate: Sue Ellspermann, state Representative
 John Gregg (Democratic), former Speaker of the Indiana House of Representatives
Running mate: Vi Simpson, state Senate Minority Leader
 Rupert Boneham (Libertarian), four-time contestant on Survivor and founder of Rupert's Kids
Running mate: Brad Klopfenstein, former executive director of the Libertarian Party of Indiana
 Donnie Harold Harris (Public Party) (write-in)
Running mate: George Fish

Debates
The Indiana Debate Commission organized three televised debates between Indiana Gubernatorial candidates Republican Mike Pence, Democrat John R. Gregg and Libertarian Rupert Boneham.
Debate schedule
The first debate was held on Wednesday, October 10, 2012 at the Zionsville Performing Arts Center in Zionsville, Indiana and was moderated by former Indianapolis Star editor Dennis Ryerson.
Complete video of debate, October 10, 2012 - C-SPAN

The second debate was held on Wednesday, October 17, 2012 at the DeBartolo Performing Arts Center in South Bend, Indiana and was
moderated by Indiana Fiscal Policy Institute president John Ketzenberger.
Complete video of debate, October 17, 2012 - C-SPAN

The third debate was held on Thursday, October 25, 2012 at the WFWA PBS 39 studio in Fort Wayne, Indiana and was moderated by DePauw University Executive Director of Media Relations Ken Owen.
Complete video of debate, October 25, 2012 - YouTube

Predictions

Polling

Statewide results

By congressional district
Pence won 6 of 9 congressional districts.

References

External links
Election Division at the Indiana Secretary of State office
Indiana gubernatorial and lieutenant gubernatorial election, 2012 at Ballotpedia

Campaign websites (archived)
 Rupert Boneham for Governor
 John R. Gregg for Governor
 Mike Pence for Governor

Indiana

Governor
2012
Mike Pence